Marc Alaimo (born Michael Joseph Alaimo; May 5, 1942) is an American actor, known for his villainous roles. He is best known for his role as recurring villain Gul Dukat in the TV series Star Trek: Deep Space Nine.

Career
Alaimo is a classically trained theatre actor, and performed as part of the Marquette University Players and the Milwaukee Repertory Theater in the 1960s in everything from Shakespeare and the classics to world premiere productions. He was also a member of various theatre companies in New York and touring companies across the country before making the move to Los Angeles in 1973. Some of his theatrical roles include Iago in Othello, Rodolpho in Arthur Miller's A View From the Bridge and Lucky in Samuel Beckett's Waiting for Godot.

Alaimo has been playing characters in television shows since 1971. He has appeared, mostly as villains, in shows such as The Doctors, Kojak, Gunsmoke, Baretta, The Six Million Dollar Man, The Bionic Woman, Starsky & Hutch, Knight Rider, Quincy, The Greatest American Hero, The Incredible Hulk, Quantum Leap, Family Guy, Walker, Texas Ranger, Wonder Woman, The Rockford Files, Hill Street Blues, Barnaby Jones, and The A-Team. Alaimo has appeared in some feature films including the 1984 science fiction movie The Last Starfighter (portraying the human guise of an alien assassin), Naked Gun : The Final Insult, Tango & Cash, and the 1988 film The Dead Pool. He also appeared as Curtis Block in the television movie Case Closed and as a security officer on Mars in the Arnold Schwarzenegger movie Total Recall.

He played several characters in Star Trek: The Next Generation (Star Trek: TNG), starting in the first season. He has the distinction of two firsts on Star Trek: TNG, playing the first Romulan, Commander Tebok, in the 1988 episode "The Neutral Zone", and the first Cardassian (in any Star Trek series), Gul Macet, in the 1991 episode, "The Wounded". He also played a poker player who speaks French to Data in the episode "Time's Arrow".  In 1993, Alaimo began playing Cardassian character Gul Dukat in Star Trek: Deep Space Nine. Gul Dukat was a recurring character that appeared in 33 episodes of that series.

Alaimo also appeared in a season two episode of 21 Jump Street. He was also featured in the 2006 video game Call of Juarez, and its 2009 prequel Call of Juarez: Bound in Blood, both times as the voice of the gunslinging Ray McCall. In 2010 he voiced The Dean in the Family Guy episode "The Splendid Source".

Personal life
Alaimo was born in Milwaukee, Wisconsin. He has a son from his first marriage, Michael Antony Alaimo (born 1971), who is a writer, story editor and producer known for The Closer, Major Crimes, Invasion, Traveler, and for penning "Columbo Likes the Nightlife," the final episode of Columbo. Alaimo also has a daughter from his second marriage. He married Lorie Bollinger on August 20, 2010.

During a Q&A panel at the Star Trek Las Vegas Convention in 2015, Alaimo revealed he is still willing to work as an actor but was out of touch with the industry and had no agency representing him at that time. Fans and co-star Andrew Robinson who was on the panel with him and was at the time planning a return to acting himself expressed support for the actor and encouraged him to continue acting.

Filmography

Film

Television

Video games

References

External links

 
 
 

1942 births
20th-century American male actors
21st-century American male actors
American male film actors
American male television actors
American people of Italian descent
Living people
Male actors from Milwaukee